Central Museum may refer to:

Nanjing Museum, formerly National Central Museum, China
Centraal Museum, Utrecht, Netherlands
Central State Museum of Kazakhstan
Indore Museum or Central Museum, India
Nagpur Central Museum, India
Southend Central Museum, England